Hill Fort Palace, also known as Ritz Hotel is a royal palace located in Naubhat Pahad, Hyderabad, Telangana. The property is now owned by Government of Telangana, Telangana State Tourism Development Corporation

History
It was built in 1915 by Nizamat Jung, who served as chief justice in the government of Nizam, India. His stay in the palace was for 15 years. The architecture is in style of Trinity College, Cambridge. 

In 1929, after he went on Haj he wanted to live a simpler life so it was purchased by  Asaf Jah VII for his son Prince Moazzam Jah, and it was then designated as the official residence of the chairman of the City Improvement Board.  

In 1955, it was taken over by Indian government after Operation Polo. It was leased to a star hotel, The Ritz Hotel Company on lease in the 1980. The hotel was operating till the late 1997.

Today, it is dilapidated and in urgent need of restoration.

Location
The palace is located in the heart of the city near Naubat Pahad spread over 6 acres.

External links

Narendra Luther's feature on the Palace

References

Hyderabad State
Heritage structures in Hyderabad, India
Royal residences in India
Palaces in Hyderabad, India
Hotels in Hyderabad
Houses completed in 1880
1880 establishments in India
Palaces of Nizams of Hyderabad